The National Archives of Pakistan is a body established by the Government of Pakistan for the purpose of preserving and making available public and private records which have bearings on the history, culture and heritage of Pakistan. Located in Islamabad, the National Archives of Pakistan is a member of the International Council on Archives. Some of its stated functions are the acquisition, preservation, conservation, reprography, restoration, automation, dissemination and access of documents. NAP is also responsible for the facilitation of important state documents and collections of dated files.

History
The Directorate of Archives and Libraries was established in 1951 under the Ministry of Education. On 8 December 1973, the directorate was divided into two which gave rise to a separate National Archives under the authority of the Cabinet Division. A major newspaper of Pakistan reported, "Despite the existence of the National Archives Act 1993 and the Archives Material (Preservation and Export Control) Act 1975, government ministries have been lax in transferring documents to NAP."

Organization 
Director General (BPS 20) heads National Archives of Pakistan. It is organized into 3 departments for record keeping, conservation, reprography and administration/accounts.

Public Record Wing 
Public Record Wing, also known as Public Collection Wing, manage the acquisition, preservation and review of public record activities.

Private Collections Wing 
Private Collections Wing is responsible for acquisition of private collections having national or historical significance.

Technical Wing 
Technical Wing is responsible to provide technical support to other departments. Technical Wing is subdivided into 3 sections.
 Microfilming
 Repair and Preservation section
 Oral Archives

National Archives Library 
National Archives Library has 19000 books, mainly on history of Indo-Pak Subcontinent.

Important collections at the NAP
The National Archives of Pakistan (NAP) houses the following important collections, among others:

 The Quaid-e-Azam papers
 The Fatima Jinnah papers
 The Ruttie Jinnah papers
 The Muslim League leaders' papers/correspondence 
 The National Freedom Movement archives
 The Allama Iqbal papers
 The Abol Hassan Ispahani papers
 The Shams ul Hassan collection (papers, documents, photographs and other archival material etc.)
 The Mufti Fazal Azeem collection 
 The Lakha collection 
 The Malik Lal Khan collection 
 The Nawab Waqar ul Mulk collection
 The Dawoodi collection
 The Mian Afzal Hussain collection
 The Manzoor ul Haq Siddiqui collection
 The Muhammad Siddique collection
 The Atiq Zafar Sheikh collection
 The Hassan Zaheer collection
 The Ehsan Danish collection
 The Aziz Beg collection
 The Sojan Singh Bedi collection
 The Azra Asghar collection
 The Kaleem collection
 The Begum Mahmooda Salim Khan collection
 Microfilms of newspapers

Activities 
NAP has participated in more than 50 international conferences, seminars, symposium and workshopsmore than 50 international conferences, seminars, symposium and workshops, and hosted International Symposium on Archives 1982 (participated 13 countries), 1989 SWARBICA Regional Seminar on Training Needs and Policies (participated by 7 countries) and 
1991 SAARC Seminar on Archives.

See also 
 List of national archives
List of museums in Pakistan

References

External links

Archives in Pakistan
Buildings and structures in Islamabad
Pakistan federal departments and agencies
Pakistan
1973 establishments in Pakistan
Government agencies established in 1973